Southold Union Free School District is a public school district located on the North Fork of Long Island, in Suffolk County, New York, United States.  It serves the central portion of the Town of Southold, including the majority of the census-designated place (CDP) of Southold, as well as the eastern portion of the CDP of Peconic.  To the east, the district is bordered by the Greenport Union Free School District; and on the west, the Mattituck-Cutchogue Union Free School District.

The total enrollment for the 2017–2018 school year was 766 students.

In the winter of 2020, tenured Superintendent David Gamberg announced his retirement from Southold School District and neighboring Greenport School District effective in June 2020. He was then replaced by now superintendent Dr. Mauro.

Schools

Southold Junior Senior High School  
For grades 7 through 12, this school also educates students from the small adjacent New Suffolk school district.

School officials include
Superintendent: Dr. Anthony Mauro
Principal: Terrence Rusch
Athletic Director and Dean of Students: Steven Flanagan

Southold Elementary School 
School officials include
Principal: Ellen O'Neill

Notable alumni

2000s 

 Eric Kehl, Southold High School Tech Director
 Sean O'Donnell, Instagram model 
 Gus Rymer, former Professional scooter rider
 Nick Vicinanza, Broadway actor
 Eric Connolly, Augustus Gloop in the Southold Elementary School performance of Willy Wonka Kids!
 Justin Rothman, Former Southold Allstar in everything
 Elliot John Shine, World Renowned Attorney
Abbey Cacovic, Dog owner

SOHO TV 
In 2013 the district launched a program called "SOHO TV" which has seen widespread acclaim throughout its existence. Since the program's conception they have completed 150+ episodes airing weekly on Fridays. The program has also recently worked with Stony Brook University for the Broadcast Awards for Senior High (BASH Awards).

References

External links
 Southold Union Free School District
 Southold Elementary School
 Southold Jr/Sr High School
 Southold Athletics

Southold, New York
School districts in New York (state)
Education in Suffolk County, New York